Paraeclipta kawensis is a species of beetle in the family Cerambycidae. It was described by Penaherrera-Leiva and Tavakilian in 2004.

References

Rhinotragini
Beetles described in 2004